Moqokori District is a district of Hiiraan, Somalia. Its capital lies at Moqokori.

References

Districts of Somalia
Hiran, Somalia